Sanjeev Kumar (born 4 October 1969) is an Indian field hockey player. He competed in the men's tournament at the 1996 Summer Olympics.

References

External links
 

1969 births
Living people
Indian male field hockey players
Olympic field hockey players of India
Field hockey players at the 1996 Summer Olympics
Place of birth missing (living people)
Asian Games medalists in field hockey
Field hockey players at the 1994 Asian Games
Asian Games silver medalists for India
Medalists at the 1994 Asian Games